The Saba Labour Party (SLP) is a political party in Saba. The 2019 elections saw the SLP lose both their seats in the Island Council.

Netherlands Antilles
Until the dissolution of the Netherlands Antilles, the party competed in island council elections and for the single Saba seat in the Estates of the Netherlands Antilles (which it failed to win in the 2002, 2006 and 2010 elections).

When Saba became part of the Netherlands on October 10, 2010, the 2007 island council stayed (where the party obtained 1 of the 5 seats) until election under Dutch law in 2011.

References

Political parties in Saba (island)
Labour parties